Conaing is an Irish language male name, it is derived from the Old English language word cyning, king, and is first attested in the 7th century. It might refer to:

 Conaing Bececlach, a legendary High King of Ireland
 Conaing mac Áedáin (died 622), a dynast in Dál Riata
 Conaing Cuirre (died 662), a king of Uisnech
 The Uí Chonaing, Kings of Knowth